Sophie Lichaba (born 29 June 1973), née Mphasane, formerly Sophie Ndaba, is a South African actress. She played Queen Moroka in the soap Generations. In 2016, she was guest judge in the final Miss South Africa 2016 beauty pageant.

Education 
She completed high school in Zimbabwe, after which she pursued her modeling career. Her mother sent her to an orphanage in Eastlea, Harare, Zimbabwe so she could get a better education than what was available in apartheid South Africa.

Personal life 
Lichaba's father, Solly Mphasane, died in 2016. She suffers from diabetes. With her former husband, Themba Ndaba, she has two children, Rudo and Lwandle. She adopted her niece, Shallon Ndaba, following the death of her sister, Tiny Mphasane. She married Max Lichaba in 2017. In late 2018, Lichaba was the victim of a rumour, which claimed that she had died.

Awards 
Duku Duku Award for “Best Soap Actress” in 2003
Golden Horn Award for “Best Comic Actor” in 2009
Woman Of Inspiration Award

Filmography 
 Class of '92
 Egoli: Place of Gold
 Generations
 Gog' Helen
 Yizo Yizo
 Soul City
 She is King
 Isidingo
 High Rollers - Season 2
 Lockdown

References

External links 
 

1973 births
Living people
South African actresses
People from Soweto